Korporacija Fabrika automobila Priboj (abbr. FAP) is a Serbian automotive manufacturer of military vehicles and with the headquarters in Priboj, Serbia.

Initially producing licensed copies of Saurer trucks, it produced Mercedes-Benz NG trucks under license. FAP is now majority owned by the Government of Serbia and it is part of "Defense Industry of Serbia".

History

1952–1970s: Early years 

Founded in 1952 by decree of Socialist Federal Republic of Yugoslavia SFRJ. On 30 October 1953, the first trucks were produced based on licence from Saurer. Models were 4G and 6G (4 and 6 tonnes). In 1959 factory was extended and capacity growth on 3600 vehicles per year. In 1961 vehicles and engines manufacturers cluster "ITV" was formed with FAP as member. The first domestically designed FAP vehicles where FAP 10B and FAP 15B introduced in serial production by 1965. The FAP 18B was made with a Leyland engine licence built by FAMOS. In 1970 a production, technical and financial cooperation contract was signed with Daimler-Benz. The first product from FAP based on contract with Daimler-Benz was LP1113, and it was followed by MB 1213 and O 302. By 1975 new manufacturing plant with 50.000 square meters was built and 150 new machines installed. New projected capacity was 10.000 vehicles/year. Licence contract with Mercedes-Benz was extended in 1976. for production of vehicle from 12 to 26 tonnes weight; many new vehicles are produced like FAP 1616, 1620, 1626, 1921, 1926, 2226 and 2626. With collaboration of FAP with Military Technical Institute Belgrade  in 1978 it is developed special military vehicles FAP 2026/6×6 and it is produced in following years in different variants to satisfy various roles in military. FAP was producing many different chassis that were used in factories in Zagreb, Skopje, Belgrade as bases for producing buses and other vehicles. In 1986 licence with Mercedes-Benz was extended for producing 12-26 tonnes gross vehicle weight.  In 1984 FAP was again extending factory in newly built industrial zone "Manovica". By their own design center, trailers where developed from 20 to 70 tonnes gross weight. Until 1991 FAP had 16,468 square meters of factory space. Trucks and other FAP products were exported worldwide.

1970s–1990s: Export success and international expedition
On 15 July 1970 FAP started production and financial cooperation, with other Yugoslavian enterprises: "FAMOS" (SR Bosnia and Herzegovina), "Autokaroserija" (SR Croatia), "11 oktomvri" (SR Macedonia). On international plan, FAP achieved export on African market: Egypt, Tanzania, Sudan, Tunis, Libya, Nigeria and Sudan.

Endurance of the FAP trucks was tested in the Gobi Desert during 1995–96 expedition "Putevi sveta (On Pathways of the World")". It is FAP 2026 GC/B 6X6  which was produced in cooperation with Ikarbus. Aim of this expedition was to cross roat Priboj-Belgrade-Moscow-Ulan Bator-Beijing-Dalyan-Belgrade-Priboj. This aim was accomplished for only 139 days in the winter season.

Among all FAP trucks, great success in sport activities had FAP 1626, with V8 Mercedes engine. During the 80s some local enterprises PIK "Belje" (Subsidiary "Beljetrans") advantage great success on FIA European Truck Racing Championship in Hungary and Spain with 22 people crew and Vlado Čugalj at the wheel. Championship in Germany was delayed due to financial problems of the PIK "Belje". FAP 1626 probably was the only truck which returned his original purpose-transportation of the load.

1990s–2010s: Limited operation

During severe economic problems in Serbia in the 1990s, FAP lost many markets and significantly deteriorated in terms of research and production. During the 2000s, it offered many variants of vehicles based on old Mercedes tooling, with different engines manufactured by Mercedes-Benz, Cummins, MAN and Famos, FAP was producing vehicles for domestic use and export. Exported vehicles could be found in many countries worldwide like Egypt, Nigeria, Libya, Sudan, Syria, etc.

Production lines consisted of military and civilian vehicles. FAP also built chassis, trailers aggregates (axles, transmissions, spare parts, cabins, shipbuilding parts etc.). All produced vehicles had EURO 3, EURO 4 or EURO 5 engines type.

2014–present: Military-oriented production
In 2014, Finnish truck maker Sisu Auto has placed offer to buy FAP, in cooperation with the Government of Serbia. However, the negotiations were shut down due to disagreements in strategy between the parties. Over the years, the Government of Serbia has worked to place the company on healthy grounds; in the process more than 1,000 employees have left the company with severance payments.

Today, FAP is operating as manufacturer and overhaul provider for the Serbian Army. In 2017, FAP delivered ten new trucks to the Serbian Army, as part of $2.5 million deal with the Serbian Ministry of Defence.

Production lines

Military production line
 FAP 1118
 FAP 2228
 FAP 3240 
 FAP 1318

Civilian production program

Lorries/trucks
 1318 B/42 Engine type OM 904 LA EU3 or OM 904 LA EU5
 1824 BD/48 4x2 Engine type OM 906 LA EU5
 1828 BD/48 4x2 Engine type MB OM 906 LA EU3
 1829 BD/48 4x2 Engine type OM 906 LA EU5
 2235 BD/45 6x2 Engine type OM 457 LA EU3
 2236 BD/45 6x2 Engine type ISL 8.9 EU5 360

Tractors
 1836 BDT/32 4x2 Engine type OM 457 LA EU3
 1840 BDT/32 4x2 Engine type OM 457 LA EU3
 2636 BDT/32 6x4 Engine type OM 457 LA EU3
 2636 BDT/32 6x4 Engine type OM 457 LA EU3

Dump trucks
 1318 BK/36 4x2 Engine type OM 904 LA EU3 or OM 904 LA EU5
 1418 BSK/36 4x4 Engine type OM 904 LA EU3 or OM 904 LA EU5
 2024 BK/38 4x2 Engine type OM 906 LA EU5
 2024 BSK/38 4x4 Engine type OM 906 LA EU5
 2629 BK/32 6x4 Engine type OM 906 LA EU5
 2630 BK/32 6x4 Engine type ISB 6.7 E5 300
 2636 BK/32 6x4 Engine type OM 457 LA EU5
 3036 BK/32 6x4 Engine type OM 457 LA EU5
 3240 BKM/32 6x4 Engine type OM 457 LA EU5 or CUMMINS ISLe4 + 400  EU4
 4140 BKM/45 8x4/4 Engine type OM 457 LA EU5

Buses
FAP produces variety of buses: City buses, Suburb buses, Intercity buses, Minibuses.

 City Bus A-537.4 CNG Engine type CUMMINS –CGe4-280 –Euro 4
City Bus A-537.3 Engine type MB OM 457 hla EU3 or MAN D2066LUH 11 EU4
 City Bus A-537.5 Engine type OM 457h LA EU5
 Single low Floor City Bus A-547.3 Engine type MB OM 457h LA EU3 or MAN D2066 LUH 12 EU4
 Double low Floor City Bus A-559.4 Engine type MAN D2066 LUH 12 EU4
 Midibus A-402 Engine type CUMMINS B180-20

Chassis
There is also a chassis in production. They are used as bases for different kind of vehicles and special upgrades.

 Chassis A-918 Engine type Cummins B 180 - 20

Vehicles history production lines
List of vehicles which are no longer in production.

Military
List of produced military vehicles in past:

FAP 13 
13-14K
18
M930
1117 (4x4)
2026 (6x6)
2832 (8x8)

Civilian
 
List of produced civilian vehicles in past:

4G
6G
10B
15B
G1100
13 
18 engine based on licence produce Leyland engine
LP1113
MB 1213
O 302
1620 
1621
1820
1823
1835 RBDT
2640 RBDT
1922 RBSK
2021 RBK 
2023 RBK 
2228
2635 RBDT
2628 RBK
2632 RBK
2635 RBK
3035 RBK
A-637
A-777

See also
 TAM
 Defense industry of Serbia

References

External links

 Official website

 
Truck manufacturers of Yugoslavia
Vehicle manufacturing companies established in 1953
Companies based in Priboj
Serbian brands
Yugoslav Serbia
Government-owned companies of Serbia
Defense industry of Serbia
Defense companies of Serbia